Files transferred over Shell protocol (FISH) is a network protocol that uses Secure Shell (SSH) or Remote Shell (RSH) to transfer files between computers and manage remote files.

The advantage of FISH is that all it requires on the server-side is an SSH or RSH implementation, Unix shell, and a set of standard Unix utilities (like ls, cat or dd—unlike other methods of remote access to files via a remote shell, scp for example, which requires scp on the server side). Optionally, there can be a special FISH server program (called start_fish_server) on the server, which executes FISH commands instead of Unix shell and thus speeds up operations.

The protocol was designed by Czech Linux Kernel Hacker, Pavel Machek, in 1998 for the Midnight Commander software tool.

Protocol messages 
Client sends text requests of the following form:

 #FISH_COMMAND arguments...
 equivalent shell commands,
 which may be multi-line

Fish commands are all defined, shell equivalents may vary.
Fish commands always have priority: the server is expected to execute a fish command if it understands it. If it does not, however, it can try to execute a shell command.
When there is no special server program, Unix shell ignores the fish command as a comment and executes the equivalent shell command(s).

Server replies are multi-line, but always end with

 ### xyz<optional text>

line. ### is a prefix to mark this line, xyz is the return code.
Return codes are a superset to those used in FTP.
The codes 000 and 001 are special, their meaning depends on presence of server output before the end line.

Session initiation 
The client initiates SSH or RSH connection with echo FISH:;/bin/sh as the command executed on remote machine. This should make it possible for the server to distinguish FISH connections from normal RSH or SSH.

The first two commands sent to the server are FISH and VER to negotiate FISH protocol, its version and extensions.

 #FISH
 echo; start_fish_server; echo '### 200'

 #VER 0.0.2 <feature1> <feature2> <...>
 echo '### 000'

The server may reply to VER command with a lines like
 VER 0.0.0 <feature2> <...>
 ### 200
which indicates supported version of the FISH protocol and supported extensions.

Implementations 
Midnight Commander
Lftp
fish:// KDE kioslave (with konqueror, Krusader or Dolphin)
 tramp-fish.el implemented it in Emacs TRAMP (but might have been thrown away if nobody needed it); Emacs TRAMP in overall has similar goals to FISH: remote access to files through a remote Unix shell.

See also 
 SSHFS
 SSH File Transfer Protocol

References

External links 
 README.fish from Midnight Commander

Network file transfer protocols